Aerolíneas Internacionales S.A. de C.V. was a Mexican domestic airline headquartered in Mexico City and had a hub in Cuernavaca Airport. Despite its name (translating to "International Airlines"), the airline never actually operated outside Mexico.

History
Aerolíneas Internacionales started operations in July 1994 with a fleet of two Boeing 727 under its President Luis Rodriguez Dorantes and his brother, Alfredo Rodriguez Dorantes.

The airline's permit was suspended by the Secretariat of Communications and Transport due to violations of safety inspections on its aircraft. Further, it had outstanding debts with Aeropuertos y Servicios Auxiliares, the Mexican Air Traffic Control (SENEAM) and the finance ministry (SHCP) of over US$7 million. Thus, all scheduled and charter operations ceased on June 13, 2003.

Destinations

The airline operated flights to:

Acapulco (Acapulco International Airport)
Aguascalientes (Aguascalientes International Airport)
Cancún (Cancún International Airport)
Ciudad Juárez (Ciudad Juárez International Airport)
Cuernavaca (General Mariano Matamoros Airport) Hub
Culiacán (Culiacán International Airport)
Guadalajara (Miguel Hidalgo y Costilla Guadalajara International Airport)
Hermosillo (Hermosillo International Airport)
León (Del Bajio International Airport
Mexico City (Mexico City International Airport)
Monterrey (Monterrey International Airport)
Morelia (General Francisco Mujica International Airport)
Reynosa (General Lucio Blanco International Airport)
Tijuana (Tijuana International Airport) Hub
Veracruz (Veracruz International Airport)

Fleet

Source:

2 Boeing 727-100
6 Boeing 727-200
1 McDonnell Douglas DC-9-14

All but one of the 727s are abandoned at Cuernavaca's airport. One of the 727s was bought by Kidzania, and is currently located in Seoul for the new opening of KidZania Seoul.

See also
List of defunct airlines of Mexico

References

External links
Fleet and code data
Route Map
Airliners Net Pictures

Defunct airlines of Mexico
Airlines established in 1994
Airlines disestablished in 2003
1994 establishments in Mexico